The 2017–18 Southeastern Louisiana Lady Lions basketball team represented Southeastern Louisiana University during the 2017–18 NCAA Division I women's basketball season. The Lady Lions, led by first year head coach Ayla Guzzardo, played their home games at the University Center. They were members of the Southland Conference. They finished the season with an 8–21 overall record and a, 7–11 record in Southland play to finish in ninth place. They failed to qualify for the Southland women's tournament.

Roster
Sources:

Schedule
Source

|-
!colspan=9 style=| Exhibition

|-
!colspan=9 style=| Non-conference regular season

|-
!colspan=9 style=| Southland Conference regular season

See also
2017–18 Southeastern Louisiana Lions basketball team

References

Southeastern Louisiana Lady Lions basketball seasons
Southeastern Louisiana
Southeastern Louisiana
Southeastern Louisiana